The Rivière aux Canots is a tributary of the Rivière aux Écorces, in the province of Quebec, in Canada. Rivière aux Canots crosses the MRC of:
 La Côte-de-Beaupré Regional County Municipality (administrative region of Capitale-Nationale): unorganized territory of  Lac-Jacques-Cartier;
 Lac-Saint-Jean-Est Regional County Municipality (administrative region of Saguenay–Lac-Saint-Jean): in the unorganized territory of  Lac-Moncouche.

The course of the Rivière aux Canots crosses the Laurentides Wildlife Reserve.

The small valley of the Rivière aux Canots is located near route 169. This valley is also served by some secondary forest roads, especially for forestry and recreational tourism activities.

Forestry is the main economic activity in this valley; recreational tourism, second.

The surface of the Rivière aux Canots is usually frozen from the beginning of December to the end of March, however the safe circulation on the ice is generally made from mid-December to mid-March.

Geography 
The main watersheds neighboring the Rivière aux Canots are:
 north side: White brook, Sancto brook, Girard brook, Panache lake, rivière aux Canots Est, Wellie brook, Apica River, Rivière aux Écorces;
 east side: Apica River, Mitchell Lake, Mignault Lake, Leboeuf Creek, Pikauba River;
 south side: Belley lake, Roy brook, Portage brook, rivière aux Écorces North-East, Rivière aux Écorces, Bolduc lake, Trompeur Lake, Rousseau Lake;
 west side: Rivière aux Écorces, Gabrielle stream.

The Rivière aux Canots rises at Lac Fleuret in the forest zone in the Laurentides Wildlife Reserve. This source is located at:
  west of Lac Oligny;
  north of the Rivière aux Canots;
  south-west of Lemay Lake which is crossed by the Apica River;
  southwest of the route 169 which runs along the Pikauba River in this segment;
  south of Mont-Apica;
  east of the confluence of Rivière aux Canots and Rivière aux Écorces;
  south-east of lac Saint-Jean.

Upper course of the Rivière aux Canots (segment of )

  to the east, then south crossing Lake Oligny on its full length, to its mouth;
  towards the west, by collecting at the beginning of the segment the discharge (coming from the east) of Petit lac Oligny, by collecting the discharge (coming from the north) of the lake in Chenille and by curving south to a stream (coming from the east);

Intermediate course of the Rivière aux Canots (segment of )

  north-west to Willie Creek (coming from the north-east);
  north-west, to the outlet (coming from the south) of a set of small lakes including Escarpment Lake and Foliaceous Pond;
  to the north, successively forming four loops to the east, up to the Caché stream (coming from the north);
  towards the north-east, forming a large curve towards the south-west, up to the outlet of Lac Lampron (coming from the east);
  north-west, up to the rivière aux Canots Est (coming from the east);

Lower reaches of the Rivière aux Canots (segment of )

  north-west, up to the outlet (coming from the north) of Lac du Panache;
  south to a bend in the river, then north-west to the outlet (coming from the south-east) of a few lakes including Bolduc lake;
  towards the west by collecting a stream (coming from the north) and the Girard stream (coming from the north) whose confluence is approximately on the limit of the regions Capitale-Nationale and Saguenay–Lac-Saint-Jean, to Sancto stream (coming from the north);
  southward, to the outlet (coming from the southeast) of lakes Bricheau and Broussard;
  north-east, east, then south while winding, to its mouth.

The Rivière aux Canots flows onto the east bank of Rivière aux Écorces. This confluence is located at:

  east of the course of the Métabetchouane River;
  south-west of route 169;
  south of the confluence of the Pikauba River and the Rivière aux Écorces;
  south of the confluence of the Pikauba River and Kenogami lake;
  southwest of the confluence of the Chicoutimi River and the Saguenay River in the Chicoutimi sector of the city of Saguenay (city).

From the mouth of Rivière aux Canots, the current successively follows the course of Rivière aux Écorces on  generally towards the north, the course of Pikauba River on  generally towards the north, crosses Kenogami Lake on  towards the northeast until barrage de Portage-des-Roches , then follows the course of the Chicoutimi River on  towards the east, then the northeast and the course of the Saguenay River on  towards the east to Tadoussac where it merges with the Saint Lawrence Estuary.

Toponymy 
The toponym “Rivière aux Canots” was formalized on December 5, 1968, at the Place Names Bank of the Commission de toponymie du Québec.

Notes and references

Appendices

Related articles 
 La Côte-de-Beaupré Regional County Municipality
 Lac-Jacques-Cartier, a TNO
 Lac-Saint-Jean-Est Regional County Municipality
 Lac-Moncouche, a TNO
 Laurentides Wildlife Reserve
 Rivière aux Canots Est
 Rivière aux Écorces
 Pikauba River
 Kenogami Lake
 Chicoutimi River
 Saguenay River
 List of rivers of Quebec

Rivers of Saguenay–Lac-Saint-Jean
Lac-Saint-Jean-Est Regional County Municipality
La Côte-de-Beaupré Regional County Municipality
Rivers of Capitale-Nationale
Laurentides Wildlife Reserve